Bibi Bimal Kaur (1951–1991) was an Indian politician and the wife of Beant Singh, one of the two assassins of Indira Gandhi.

Biography 
Bibi Bimal Kaur was a nurse at Lady Hardinge Medical College when her husband assassinated Indira Gandhi. Immediately after the assassination she was picked by the Indian security forces, she disappeared for several days leaving her children Amrit, Sarabjeet and Jassi at home. The Damdami Taksal paid for her children's education for two years.

Bimal Kaur was later arrested and imprisoned for two years for an incendiary speech in a gurdwara. On Wednesday, June 4, 1986, when she was 35 years old, she led a rampaging group of Sikh warriors , about 200 in number, armed and attacking the guards at the Golden Temple, to mark the Operation Blue Star. The crowd cheered for Khalistan, and openly threatened to kill Punjab’s moderate chief minister, Surjit Singh Barnala. A guard was killed and seven people were injured. Many journalists, about a dozen, witnessed the guard’s death and remained mute spectators.

Later she was elected a member of Lok Sabha from Ropar. Her father-in-law, Beant Singh's father, Sucha Singh Maloa was a member of parliament Sarbjit Singh, her son, was nominated by the SAD (A) headed by Simranjit Singh Mann to run for parliament from the  Bathinda and Mansa in 2004.

Bimal Kaur died on 2 September 1991. Her death is shrouded in mystery. The first reports that reached the press indicated that Bimal Khalsa consumed cyanide. As she had small children, the suspicion immediately arose that she had been forcibly administered cyanide. Subsequently, this story was "corrected" by the police and it was given out that she had died by electrocution while using a washing machine. A 13-year-old servant normally did this work but this boy was not in the house at the time of her death. Her nearest relative demanded a post-mortem which, under normal circumstances, the police was bound to conduct on request but the police refused this.

References

 

Sikh martyrs
Indian women nurses
Indian prisoners and detainees
Prisoners and detainees of India
1991 deaths
Accidental deaths by electrocution
Punjabi people
Accidental deaths in India
India MPs 1989–1991
Lok Sabha members from Punjab, India
Women in Punjab, India politics
20th-century Indian women politicians
20th-century Indian politicians
People from Rupnagar district
1951 births